Metropolitan Mikhail (4 July 1921 – 23 November 2014), was the Elder Metropolitan of the Holy Metropolis of Asyut (Lycopolis), (Hieracon, (Hierakonopolis) and (Apollonopolis Parva) of the Coptic Orthodox Church of Alexandria and was the Abbot of the Monastery of Saint Macarius the Great, in Scetes, Lower Egypt until early 2009, when he decided to resign this responsibility due to his failing health and also due to the demise of Matta El-Meskeen, the Chief Hegumen in-charge of the Monastery of Saint Macarius the Great in 2008.

Metropolitan Mikhail was born "Matyas Hanna" in 1921, in the poor family of Egyptian Coptic Christians in the village of "Al-Rahmaniya", in the district of "Nag Hammadi" in "Qena" Governorate. He became a monk of the Monastery of St. Macarius the Great on 19 February 1939, taking the name Matyas al-Maqari. He was ordained priest on 17 November 1939. He studied in the Monastic School of Helwan from 1942–1944.

He served as Coptic Orthodox Metropolitan of Asyut since 1946. His episcopal ordination took place on 25 August 1946. For many years, he was the most senior Oriental Orthodox bishop in the date of episcopal ordination in the world.

He died on 23 November 2014 in Asyut, Egypt.

See also

 List of Copts
 The Holy Synod of the Coptic Orthodox Church
 Monastery of Saint Macarius the Great

References

 https://web.archive.org/web/20080724094819/http://www.theholysynod.copticpope.org/m001.htm

Sources
 Metropolitan Mikhail of Asyut (1920-2014) | Archive of Contemporary Coptic Orthodox Theology (St Cyril's Coptic Orthodox Theological College)
The Holy Synod (in Arabic and English)
 http://www.anbawissa.org/vb/showthread.php?t=11930 (in Arabic)
 http://www.hierarchy.religare.ru/h-aincvost-monofiz.html (in Russian)

Coptic Orthodox bishops
Egyptian Christian monks
1921 births
2014 deaths
Coptic Orthodox Christians from Egypt